Boj is an animated children's television series created by Pesky Productions that was first broadcast on CBeebies.

Characters
Boj (voiced by Ziggy Badans) is an anthropomorphic bilby.
Mimi (voiced by Josie Taylor) is Boj's mother wearing purple sandals.
Pops (voiced by Jason Donovan) is Boj's father.
Denzil Woof (voiced by Angelo Illsey) is a brown anthropomorphic dog.
Ruby Woof  (voiced by Caroline Shaw) is a female dog who owns Ruby's Diner and is Denzil’s mum.
Dr Bruce Woof (voiced by Dave Benson Phillips) is the local doctor and Denzil's dad.
Gavin Bleat (voiced by Jack Gardner) is a yellow anthropomorphic goat.
Blair Bleat  (voiced by Dan Chambers) is an American goat who is a gadget enthusiast and Gavin's dad.
Bonnie Bleat (voiced by Dominica Warburton) is Gavin's mum.
Mia Twitch (voiced by Sophie Goldsteinin) is a white anthropomorphic mouse.
Julie Twitch (voiced by Dominica Warburton) is Mia’s single mom.
The Twitchlets (voiced by Claire Underwood) are Mia's five little brothers.
Rupa Nibblit (voiced by Poppy Hodgson) is an anthropomorphic rabbit.
Deepak Nibblit (voiced by Omar Khan) is Rupa's dad.
Geeta Nibblit (voiced by Kuchi Braaso) Rupa's mum.
Mr Cloppity (voiced by Dan Chambers) is a Scottish anthropomorphic horse who is the groundskeeper of Giggly Park. His first name is "Clive", as revealed in the 22 minute special "Adventure Camp".
Miss Claire Clippity (voiced by Dominica Warburton) is an anthropomorphic horse and a friend of Mr. Cloppity’s who appears in "Adventure Camp".
Hoj (voiced by Samuel Dyson), is an anthropomorphic bilby and Boj's cousin. He appears in "Adventure Camp".
Bibi (voiced by Maria Darling) is an anthropomorphic bilby who is Boj's aunt and Hoj’s mom. She appears in "Adventure Camp".

Episodes

Season 1 (2014–2015)

Home release

References

External links
 
 

2014 British television series debuts
2015 British television series endings
2010s British animated television series
2010s British children's television series
British children's animated adventure television series
British flash animated television series
Irish children's animated adventure television series
Irish flash animated television series
English-language television shows
BBC children's television shows
Animated television series about mammals
Animated television series about children
CBeebies
British preschool education television series
Irish preschool education television series
Animated preschool education television series
2010s preschool education television series